The Baltimore Orioles' 2011 season was the 111th season in franchise history, the 58th in Baltimore, and the 20th at Oriole Park at Camden Yards. It also marked the last year of a streak of fourteen consecutive losing seasons dating back to 1998.

Offseason
The 2010–11 offseason has been notable for the Orioles, featuring a complete makeover of their infield, with only Brian Roberts expected to reprise his starting role.  On December 6, 2010, the Orioles completed a trade with the Arizona Diamondbacks for third basemen Mark Reynolds, in exchange for relief pitchers David Hernandez and Kam Mickolio.  The next day, the Orioles lost corner infielder, second baseman (40 games in 2010), and lone 2010 All-Star representative Ty Wigginton when he signed with the Colorado Rockies. On December 9, however, a deal was struck with the Minnesota Twins, acquiring shortstop J. J. Hardy, utility infielder Brendan Harris and cash in exchange for minor league pitchers Jim Hoey and Brett Jacobson. The following day, the Orioles re-signed former starting shortstop César Izturis, though now as a utility middle infielder.  Finally, after weeks of rumor and speculation, concerning possible first base signings, the Orioles inked veteran free agent Derrek Lee on January 6, 2011.

The Orioles also worked to stabilize their bullpen whose depth had been weakened in trades to strengthen the infield. They began on December 13 by re-signing former starter and de facto closer Koji Uehara.  The following day, the Orioles signed former Toronto Blue Jays reliever Jeremy Accardo.  A month later on January 13, the Orioles signed former Blue Jays closer Kevin Gregg.  Though still on the 40-man roster, the Orioles may have lost reliever Alfredo Simón, as he was charged with involuntary manslaughter in the Dominican Republic, following an accidental shooting death of his cousin during a New Year's celebration.

In addition to shoring up their bullpen, the Orioles signed Justin Duchscherer to a one-year deal.

On February 4, the Orioles signed free agent Vladimir Guerrero to solidify the offense.  Guerrero had hit for 29 home runs and a .300 average in the 2010 season with the Texas Rangers. He also had a career average of .320 and 436 home runs prior to the 2011 season.

Regular season

The team started the season 4–0, the first time since the 1997 baseball season.

The Orioles eliminated the Boston Red Sox from the playoff on the final day of the season, the last of their five victories over the Red Sox in September. The Orioles were 15–13 in September, including two extra-inning wins over the division champion New York Yankees and another two wins against the AL wild card Tampa Bay Rays on September 13–14. They also stopped division champion Detroit Tigers's Justin Verlander attempt at 25 wins, beating the Tigers 6–5 while scoring five runs in Verlander's seven innings.

Roster

Season standings

Record vs. opponents

September 28 -- Game 162

Despite being in last place in the division (29 games out and with a 68–93 record), the Baltimore Orioles were a part of what is famously touted in Major League Baseball lore as the "Best Night Ever" in baseball with the AL and NL wild cards still tied and were up for grabs. The Orioles had gone 4-2 down the stretch vs. Boston with game 162 still left to play in Baltimore. The game was broadcast on ESPN as well as the MASN and NESN networks. The Orioles were aiming to play the role of spoiler and end the Red Sox season with help from the Tampa Bay Rays.

In the AL wild card race, The Boston Red Sox were suffering through a 7-19 stretch in which they had blown a nine-game lead on August 30 (which gave them more than a 99.7% chance of making the playoffs). This was a do-or-die game for the Red Sox, but felt they had a lot of momentum going into this game having beaten the Orioles, 8–7, the night before.

The Orioles sent Alfredo Simón, who had a history of success vs. Boston against Jon Lester, who was 14-0 lifetime with a 3.26 ERA against the Baltimore Orioles. The scoring got started with Dustin Pedroia getting a single to score Mike Avilés to give the Red Sox a 1–0 lead. However, the Orioles struck back in the bottom of the 3rd as J. J. Hardy, laced his 30th home run of the season into left field to give the O's a 2–1 advantage. In the top of the 4th with Marco Scutaro at 3rd base, a controversial balk call was made on Alfredo Simón which tied up the game at two apiece. The bottom of the 4th went by one-two-three for the O's. In the top of the 5th, Dustin Pedroia hit a one-out solo home run to give the Red Sox back the lead, 3–2. At the start of the bottom of the 7th, the game was delayed for 85 minutes because of some heavy thunderstorms that moved through the area. In the top of the 8th, Marco Scutaro had singled to right and was on as a hopeful insurance run to boost the Red Sox lead. Carl Crawford then picked up a double after Nolan Reimold mistimed his jump to make the catch and Adam Jones fired the ball to catcher Matt Wieters to get Scutaro out. Mike Avilés fouled out and the inning ended.

In the bottom of the 9th inning, the Boston Red Sox sported a 77–0 record when leading after the 8th inning and the O's were down 3–2 to the Red Sox versus top closer Jonathan Papelbon, Chris Davis laced a double to the garage door in right field to put him on 2nd base. The next batter was Nolan Reimold (who hit pretty well against Boston pitching) and on a 2-2 count, Reimold laced a drive into the gap in right center field which one hopped the warning track over the wall for a ground rule double. The next batter following with Reimold on 2nd base was Robert Andino. Andino had success against the Red Sox as he hit .300 versus their pitching and was having an excellent series. Andino laced the 1-1 pitch towards Carl Crawford who was playing a bit too far deep and slid and trapped the ball. Reimold made a mad dash towards home. After Reimold slid to score the winning run, he and Andino were mobbed by their teammates, as they knew that they had just eliminated the Red Sox.

The Orioles' win broke ESPN's viewership record for a Wednesday Night game bringing in a 1.6 rating, 1.546M household impressions, and 2.116M viewers. It also broke Major League Baseball's record for internet traffic in one day. The game itself made national headlines as well the next morning on Headline News, CNN, Fox News, and many other international news media outlets.

Calls from the game

Game log

|-  style="text-align:center; background:#cfc;"
| 1 || April 1 || @ Rays || 4–1 || Guthrie (1–0) || Price (0–1) ||  || 34,078  || 1–0
|-  style="text-align:center; background:#cfc;"
| 2 || April 2 || @ Rays || 3–1 || Accardo (1–0)  || Shields (0–1)  || Gregg (1)  || 22,164  || 2–0
|-  style="text-align:center; background:#cfc;"
| 3 || April 3 || @ Rays || 5–1 || Britton (1–0) || Davis (0–1) ||  || 17,408 || 3–0
|-  style="text-align:center; background:#cfc;"
| 4 || April 4 || Tigers || 5–1  || Arrieta (1–0)  || Porcello (0–1)  ||   || 46,593  || 4–0
|-  style="text-align:center; background:#fbb;"
| 5 || April 6 || Tigers || 3–7  || Verlander (1–0) || Bergesen (0–1) ||  || 12,451 || 4–1
|-  style="text-align:center; background:#cfc;"
| 6 || April 7 || Tigers || 9–5  || Johnson (1–0) || Thomas (0–1) ||  || 11,648  || 5–1
|-  style="text-align:center; background:#bbb;"
| – || April 8 || Rangers || colspan=6| Postponed (rain); Makeup: April 9 as part of a doubleheader
|-  style="text-align:center; background:#cfc;"
| 7 || April 9 || Rangers || 5–0  || Britton (2–0)  || Lewis (0–1)  ||  || —  || 6–1
|-  style="text-align:center; background:#fbb;"
| 8 || April 9 || Rangers || 1–13  || Harrison (2–0) || Arrieta (1–1) ||  || 36,243 || 6–2
|-  style="text-align:center; background:#fbb;"
| 9 || April 10 || Rangers || 0–3  || Holland (2–0) || Guthrie (1–1) || Feliz (3) || 21,452 || 6–3
|-  style="text-align:center; background:#bbb;"
| – || April 12 || @ Yankees || colspan=6| Postponed (rain); Makeup: July 30 as part of a doubleheader
|-  style="text-align:center; background:#fbb;"
| 10 || April 13 || @ Yankees || 4–7 || Burnett (3–0) || Tillman (0–1) || Rivera (5) || 42,171 || 6–4
|-  style="text-align:center; background:#fbb;"
| 11 || April 14 || @ Yankees || 5–6 (10) || Rivera (1–0) || Gonzalez (0–1) ||  || 40,517 || 6–5
|-  style="text-align:center; background:#fbb;"
| 12 || April 15 || @ Indians || 2–8  || Masterson (3–0) || Britton (2–1) ||  || 16,346 || 6–6
|-  style="text-align:center; background:#fbb;"
| 13 || April 16 || @ Indians || 3–8  || Tomlin (3–0) || Guthrie (1–2) || || 10,714 || 6–7
|-  style="text-align:center; background:#fbb;"
| 14 || April 17 || @ Indians || 2–4  || Carmona (1–2) || Bergesen (0–2) || Perez (5) || 13,017 || 6–8
|-  style="text-align:center; background:#fbb;"
| 15 || April 18 || Twins || 3–5 || Liriano (1–3) || Tillman (0–2) || Capps (2) || 13,138 || 6–9
|-  style="text-align:center; background:#cfc;"
| 16 || April 19 || Twins || 11–0 || Arrieta (2–1) || Pavano (1–2) ||  || 12,045 || 7–9
|-  style="text-align:center; background:#cfc;"
| 17 || April 20 || Twins || 5–4 || Britton (3–1)  || Blackburn (1–3)  || Gregg (2)  || 13,825  || 8–9
|-  style="text-align:center; background:#fbb;"
| 18 || April 21 || Twins || 1–3 || Baker (1–2) || Guthrie (1–3) || Capps (3) || 16,769 || 8–10
|-  style="text-align:center; background:#bbb;"
| – || April 22 || Yankees || colspan=6| Postponed (rain); Makeup: August 27 as part of a doubleheader
|-  style="text-align:center; background:#fbb;"
| 19 || April 23 || Yankees || 3–15 || Sabathia (1–1) || Bergesen (0–3) ||  || 39,054 || 8–11
|-  style="text-align:center; background:#fbb;"
| 20 || April 24 || Yankees || 3–6 (11) || Logan (1–1) || Berken (0–1)  ||  || 25,051 || 8–12
|-  style="text-align:center; background:#cfc;"
| 21 || April 26 || Red Sox || 4–1  || Britton (4–1) || Buchholz (1–3) || Gregg (3) || 18,938 || 9–12
|-  style="text-align:center; background:#cfc;"
| 22 || April 27 || Red Sox || 5–4 || Uehara (1–0) || Bard (0–3) || Gregg (4) || 15,514 || 10–12 
|-  style="text-align:center; background:#fbb;"
| 23 || April 28 || Red Sox || 2–6  || Lester (3–1) || Johnson (1–1) ||  || 21,209 || 10–13
|-  style="text-align:center; background:#cfc;"
| 24 || April 29 || @ White Sox || 10–4 || Arrieta (3–1) || Danks (0–4) ||  || 21,816 || 11–13
|-  style="text-align:center; background:#cfc;"
| 25 || April 30 || @ White Sox || 6–2 || Tillman (1–2) || Humber (2–3) ||  || 26,104 || 12–13
|-

|-  style="text-align:center; background:#cfc;"
| 26 || May 1 || @ White Sox || 6–4 || Britton (5–1) || Floyd (3–2) || Gregg (5) || 22,029 || 13–13
|-  style="text-align:center; background:#fbb;"
| 27 || May 2 || @ White Sox || 2–6 || Buehrle (2–3) || Guthrie (1–4) || Santos (3) || 18,007 || 13–14
|-  style="text-align:center; background:#fbb;"
| 28 || May 3 || @ Royals || 5–6 || Collins (2–1) || Berken (0–2) ||  || 11,986 || 13–15
|-  style="text-align:center; background:#cfc;"
| 29 || May 4 || @ Royals || 3–2 || Arrieta (4–1) || Davies (1–4) || Gregg (6) || 11,130 || 14–15
|-  style="text-align:center; background:#fbb;"
| 30 || May 5 || @ Royals || 1–9 || Chen (4–1) || Tillman (1–3) ||  || 29,927 || 14–16
|-  style="text-align:center; background:#fbb;"
| 31 || May 6 || Rays || 2–6 || Shields (3–1) || Britton (5–2) ||  || 20,694 || 14–17
|-  style="text-align:center; background:#fbb;"
| 32 || May 7 || Rays || 2–8 || Hellickson (3–2) || Guthrie (1–5) ||  || 18,961 || 14–18
|-  style="text-align:center; background:#fbb;"
| 33 || May 8 || Rays || 3–5 || Davis (4–2) || Bergesen (0–4) || Farnsworth (7) || 16,359 || 14–19
|-  style="text-align:center; background:#cfc;"
| 34 || May 10 || Mariners || 7–6 (13) || Accardo (2–0) || League (0–2) || || 11,485 || 15–19
|-  style="text-align:center; background:#cfc;"
| 35 || May 11 || Mariners || 4–2 || Tillman (2–3) || F. Hernández (4–3) || Gregg (7) || 11,561 || 16–19
|-  style="text-align:center; background:#cfc;"
| 36 || May 12 || Mariners || 2–1 (12) || Johnson (2–1) || League (0–3) ||  || 19,082 || 17–19
|-  style="text-align:center; background:#fbb;"
| 37 || May 13 || @ Rays || 0–3 || Hellickson (4–2) || Guthrie (1–6) ||  || 20,476 || 17–20
|-  style="text-align:center; background:#cfc;"
| 38 || May 14 || @ Rays || 6–0 || Bergesen (1–4) || Davis (4–3) ||  || 28,451 || 18–20
|-  style="text-align:center; background:#cfc;"
| 39 || May 15 || @ Rays || 9–3 || Arrieta (5–1) || Sonnanstine (0–1) ||  || 21,505 || 19–20
|-  style="text-align:center; background:#fbb;"
| 40 || May 16 || @ Red Sox || 7–8 || Aceves (1–0) || Gregg (0–1) ||  || 37,138 || 19–21 
|-  style="text-align:center; background:#bbb;"
| – || May 17 || @ Red Sox || colspan=6| Postponed (rain); Makeup: September 19 as part of a doubleheader 
|-  style="text-align:center; background:#fbb;"
| 41 || May 18 || Yankees || 1–4 (15) || Noesí (1–0) || Accardo (2–1) ||  || 20,589 || 19–22
|-  style="text-align:center; background:#fbb;"
| 42 || May 19 || Yankees || 2–13 || Sabathia (4–3) || Bergesen (1–5) ||  || 24,939 || 19–23
|-  style="text-align:center; background:#fbb;"
| 43 || May 20 || Nationals || 5–17 || Rodriguez (1–0) || Arrieta (5–2) ||  || 24,442 || 19–24
|-  style="text-align:center; background:#cfc;"
| 44 || May 21 || Nationals || 8–3 || Guthrie (2–6) || Lannan (2–5) ||  || 33,107 || 20–24
|-  style="text-align:center; background:#cfc;"
| 45 || May 22 || Nationals || 2–1 || Johnson (3–1) || Zimmermann (2–5) || Gregg (8) || 33,626 || 21–24
|-  style="text-align:center; background:#cfc;"
| 46 || May 24 || Royals || 5–3 || Simón (1–0) || Soria (3–1) ||  || 14,077 || 22–24
|-  style="text-align:center; background:#cfc;"
| 47 || May 25 || Royals || 9–2 || Arrieta (6–2) || Hochevar (3–5) ||  || 15,740 || 23–24
|-  style="text-align:center; background:#cfc;"
| 48 || May 26 || Royals || 6–5 (12) || Accardo (3–1) || Coleman (0–2) ||  || 22,720 || 24–24
|-  style="text-align:center; background:#fbb;"
| 49 || May 27 || @ Athletics || 2–6 || Ziegler (1–0) || Simón (1–1) ||  || 12,110 || 24–25
|-  style="text-align:center; background:#fbb;"
| 50 || May 28 || @ Athletics || 2–4 || Outman (1–0) || Bergesen (1–6) || Fuentes (10) || 23,795 || 24–26
|-  style="text-align:center; background:#fbb;"
| 51 || May 29 || @ Athletics || 4–6 || Moscoso (2–0) || Britton (5–3) || Fuentes (11) || 15,373 || 24–27
|-  style="text-align:center; background:#fbb;"
| 52 || May 30 || @ Mariners || 3–4 || Fister (3–5) || Arrieta (6–3) || League (14) || 22,819 || 24–28
|-  style="text-align:center; background:#fbb;"
| 53 || May 31 || @ Mariners || 2–3 || Ray (2–1) || Guthrie (2–7) || League (15) || 11,692 || 24–29
|-

|-  style="text-align:center; background:#cfc;"
| 54 || June 1 || @ Mariners || 2–1 || Johnson (4–1) || Wright (1–2) || Gregg (9) || 18,036 || 25–29 
|-  style="text-align:center; background:#fbb;"
| 55 || June 3 || Blue Jays || 4–8 || Villanueva (3–0) || Britton (5–4) ||  || 18,587 || 25–30
|-  style="text-align:center; background:#cfc;"
| 56 || June 4 || Blue Jays || 5–3 || Arrieta (7–3) || Romero (5–5) || Gregg (10) || 20,086 || 26–30
|-  style="text-align:center; background:#fbb;"
| 57 || June 5 || Blue Jays || 4–7 || Reyes (2–4) || Guthrie (2–8) ||  || 25,431 || 26–31
|-  style="text-align:center; background:#cfc;"
| 58 || June 6 || Athletics || 4–2 || Matusz (1–0) || Gonzalez (5–4) || Gregg (11) || 10,556 || 27–31
|-  style="text-align:center; background:#cfc;"
| 59 || June 7 || Athletics || 4–0 || Jakubauskas (1–0) || Moscoso (2–2) ||  || 13,652 || 28–31
|-  style="text-align:center; background:#cfc;"
| 60 || June 8 || Athletics || 3–2 || Britton (6–4) || Outman (1–1) || Gregg (12) || 11,760 || 29–31 
|-  style="text-align:center; background:#cfc;"
| 61 || June 10 || Rays || 7–0 || Arrieta (8–3) || Hellickson (7–4) ||  || 17,900 || 30–31
|-  style="text-align:center; background:#fbb;"
| 62 || June 11 || Rays || 5–7 (11) || Cruz (4–0) || Accardo (3–2) || Farnsworth (14) || 25,541 || 30–32
|-  style="text-align:center; background:#fbb;"
| 63 || June 12 || Rays || 6–9 || Davis (5–5) || Matusz (1–1) || Howell (1) || 22,032 || 30–33
|-  style="text-align:center; background:#fbb;"
| 64 || June 14 || @ Blue Jays || 5–6 (11) || Camp (1–1) || Uehara (1–1) ||  || 15,592 || 30–34
|-  style="text-align:center; background:#fbb;"
| 65 || June 15 || @ Blue Jays || 1–4 || Romero (6–6) || Arrieta (8–4) || Francisco (6) || 14,541 || 30–35
|-  style="text-align:center; background:#cfc;"
| 66 || June 16 || @ Blue Jays || 4–3 || Berken (1–2) || Rauch (2–3) || Gregg (13) || 31,822 || 31–35
|-  style="text-align:center; background:#fbb;"
| 67 || June 17 || @ Nationals || 4–8 || Burnett (3–3) || Accardo (3–3) || || 35,562 || 31–36
|-  style="text-align:center; background:#fbb;"
| 68 || June 18 || @ Nationals || 2–4 || Zimmermann (5–6) || Matusz (1–2) || Storen (17) || 36,614 || 31–37
|-  style="text-align:center; background:#cfc;"
| 69 || June 19 || @ Nationals || 7–4 || Jakubauskas (2–0) || Gorzelanny (2–5) || || 35,439 || 32–37
|-  style="text-align:center; background:#cfc;"
| 70 || June 20 || @ Pirates || 8–3 || Arrieta (9–4) || Morton (7–4) || || 22,447 || 33–37
|-  style="text-align:center; background:#fbb;"
| 71 || June 21 || @ Pirates || 3–9 || Resop (3–2) || Guthrie (2–9) || || 33,806 || 33–38
|-  style="text-align:center; background:#fbb;"
| 72 || June 22 || @ Pirates || 4–5 || Correia (9–6) || Britton (6–5) || Hanrahan (20) || 19,418 || 33–39
|-  style="text-align:center; background:#cfc;"
| 73 || June 24 || Reds || 5–4 (12) || Gonzalez (1–1) || Arredondo (0–3) || || 45,382 || 34–39
|-  style="text-align:center; background:#fbb;"
| 74 || June 25 || Reds || 5–10 || Arroyo (7–6) || Matusz (1–3) || || 38,976 || 34–40
|-  style="text-align:center; background:#cfc;"
| 75 || June 26 || Reds || 7–5 || Guthrie (3–9) || Bailey (3–2) || Gregg (14) || 27,809 || 35–40
|-  style="text-align:center; background:#fbb;"
| 76 || June 28 || Cardinals || 2–6 || Lohse (8–4) || Britton (6–6) || || 20,556 || 35–41
|-  style="text-align:center; background:#fbb;"
| 77 || June 29 || Cardinals ||  1–5 || Carpenter (3–7) || Jakubauskas (2–1) || || 17,405 || 35–42
|-  style="text-align:center; background:#fbb;"
| 78 || June 30 ||  Cardinals || 6–9 || García (7–3) || Matusz (1–4) || Salas (13) || 28,340 || 35–43
|-

|-  style="text-align:center; background:#fbb;"
| 79 || July 1 || @ Braves || 0–4 || Jurrjens (11–3) || Guthrie (3–10) ||  || 33,261 || 35–44 
|-  style="text-align:center; background:#fbb;"
| 80 || July 2 || @ Braves || 4–5 || Hudson (7–6) || Arrieta (9–5) || Kimbrel (24) || 37,259 || 35–45
|-  style="text-align:center; background:#cfc;"
| 81 || July 3 || @ Braves || 5–4 || Johnson (5–1) || Proctor (1–2) || Gregg (15) || 23,492 || 36–45
|-  style="text-align:center; background:#fbb;"
| 82 || July 4 || @ Rangers || 4–13 || Lewis (8–7) || Jakubauskas (2–2) ||  || 42,885 || 36–46
|-  style="text-align:center; background:#fbb;"
| 83 || July 5 || @ Rangers || 2–4 || Hunter (1–0) || Johnson (5–2) || Feliz (17) || 25,945 || 36–47
|-  style="text-align:center; background:#fbb;"
| 84 || July 6 || @ Rangers || 5–13 || Ogando (9–3) || Guthrie (3–11) ||  || 31,953 || 36–48
|-  style="text-align:center; background:#fbb;"
| 85 || July 7 || @ Red Sox || 4–10 || Miller (3–0) || Arrieta (9–6) ||  || 37,981 || 36–49 
|-  style="text-align:center; background:#fbb;"
| 86 || July 8 || @ Red Sox || 3–10 || Beckett (8–3) || Britton (6–7) ||  || 37,729 || 36–50
|-  style="text-align:center; background:#fbb;"
| 87 || July 9 || @ Red Sox || 0–4 || Lackey (6–8) || Simón (1–2) ||  || 38,205 || 36–51
|-  style="text-align:center; background:#fbb;"
| 88 || July 10 || @ Red Sox || 6–8 || Aceves (4–1) || Guthrie (3–12) || Papelbon (20) || 37,688 || 36–52 
|-  style="text-align:center; background:#fbb;"
| 89 || July 14 || Indians || 4–8 || Masterson (8–6) || Guthrie (3–13) ||  || 22,780 || 36–53 
|-  style="text-align:center; background:#fbb;"
| 90 || July 15 || Indians || 5–6 || Tomlin (11–4) || Johnson (5–3) || Perez (22) || 27,352 || 36–54
|-  style="text-align:center; background:#cfc;"
| 91 || July 16 || Indians || 6–5 || Simón (2–2) || Carrasco (8–7) || Gonzalez (1) || 24,835 || 37–54
|-  style="text-align:center; background:#cfc;"
| 92 || July 17 || Indians || 8–3 || Hendrickson (1–0) || Gómez (0–2) ||  || 17,754 || 38–54
|-  style="text-align:center; background:#fbb;"
| 93 || July 18 || Red Sox || 10–15 || Wheeler (2–1) || Gonzalez (1–2) ||  || 27,924 || 38–55
|-  style="text-align:center; background:#cfc;"
| 94 || July 19 || Red Sox || 6–2 || Guthrie (4–13) || Weiland (0–1) || Johnson (1) || 32,314 || 39–55
|-  style="text-align:center; background:#fbb;"
| 95 || July 20 || Red Sox || 0–4 || Miller (4–1) || Arrieta (9–7) ||  || 35,174 || 39–56
|-  style="text-align:center; background:#fbb;"
| 96 || July 22 || Angels || 1–6 || Santana (5–8) || Simón (2–3) || Takahashi (1) || 24,823 || 39–57
|-  style="text-align:center; background:#cfc;"
| 97 || July 23 || Angels || 3–2 || Bergesen (2–6) || Piñeiro (5–5) || Gregg (16) || 20,311 || 40–57
|-  style="text-align:center; background:#fbb;"
| 98 || July 24 || Angels || 3–9 || Chatwood (6–6) || Guthrie (4–14) ||  || 15,676 || 40–58
|-  style="text-align:center; background:#cfc;"
| 99 || July 26 || @ Blue Jays || 12–4 || Arrieta (10–7) || Morrow (7–5) ||  || 17,477 || 41–58
|-  style="text-align:center; background:#fbb;"
| 100 || July 27 || @ Blue Jays || 0–3 || Romero (8–9) || Simón (2–4) || Rauch (8) || 16,861 || 41–59
|-  style="text-align:center; background:#fbb;"
| 101 || July 28 || @ Blue Jays || 5–8 || Villanueva (6–2) || Bergesen (2–7) || || 16,152 || 41–60
|-  style="text-align:center; background:#cfc;"
| 102 || July 29 || @ Yankees || 4–2 || Guthrie (5–14) || Burnett (8–9) || Gregg (17) || 46,499 || 42–60
|-  style="text-align:center; background:#fbb;"
| 103 || July 30 ||  @ Yankees || 3–8 || Colón (8–6) || Tillman (2–4) || || 46,469 || 42–61
|-  style="text-align:center; background:#fbb;"
| 104 || July 30 ||  @ Yankees || 3–17 || Nova (9–4) || Britton (6–8) || || 43,190 || 42–62
|-  style="text-align:center; background:#fbb;"
| 105 || July 31 ||  @ Yankees || 2–4 || García (10–7) || Arrieta (10–8) || Rivera (27) || 46,913 || 42–63
|-

|-  style="text-align:center; background:#cfc;"
| 106 || August 2 || @ Royals || 8–2 || Simón (3–4) || Chen (5–5) ||  || 17,116 || 43–63
|-  style="text-align:center; background:#fbb;"
| 107 || August 3 || @ Royals || 2–6 || Hochevar (8–8) || Guthrie (5–15) || Holland (1) || 14,187 || 43–64 
|-  style="text-align:center; background:#fbb;"
| 108 || August 4 || @ Royals || 4–9 || Wood (5–0) || Britton (6–9) ||  || 12,161 || 43–65 
|-  style="text-align:center; background:#fbb;"
| 109 || August 5 || Blue Jays || 4–5 || Mills (1–1) || Hunter (1–2) || Rauch (11) || 18,770 || 43–66 
|-  style="text-align:center; background:#cfc;"
| 110 || August 6 || Blue Jays || 6–2 || Tillman (3–4) || Morrow (8–6) ||  || 19,396 || 44–66
|-  style="text-align:center; background:#fbb;"
| 111 || August 7 || Blue Jays || 2–7 || Romero (10–9) || Simón (3–5) ||  || 13,824 || 44–67 
|-  style="text-align:center; background:#fbb;"
| 112 || August 8 || White Sox || 6–7 || Crain (6–3) || Johnson (5–4) || Santos (23) || 17,498 || 44–68 
|-  style="text-align:center; background:#fbb;"
| 113 || August 9 || White Sox || 3–4 || Floyd (10–10) || Reyes (5–9) || Santos (24) || 14,177 || 44–69 
|-  style="text-align:center; background:#cfc;"
| 114 || August 10 || White Sox || 6–4 (10) || Gonzalez (2–2) || Frasor (2–2) ||  || 18,747 || 45–69
|-  style="text-align:center; background:#fbb;"
| 115 || August 11 || White Sox || 3–6 || Buehrle (10–5) || Tillman (3–5) || Santos (25) || 21,040 || 45–70
|-  style="text-align:center; background:#fbb;"
| 116 || August 12 || Tigers || 4–5 || Penny (8–9) || Patton (0–1) || Valverde (34) || 21,465 || 45–71
|-  style="text-align:center; background:#fbb;"
| 117 || August 13 || Tigers || 5–6 || Scherzer (12–7) || Guthrie (5–16) || Valverde (35) || 24,144 || 45–72
|-  style="text-align:center; background:#bfb;"
| 118 || August 14 || Tigers || 8–5 || Reyes (6–9) || Fister (4–13) || Johnson (2) || 18,348 || 46–72
|-  style="text-align:center; background:#bfb;"
| 119 || August 15 || @ Athletics || 6–2 || Hunter (2–2) || Gonzalez (9–11) ||  || 10,122 || 47–72
|-  style="text-align:center; background:#fbb;"
| 120 || August 16 || @ Athletics || 4–8 || Moscoso (6–6) || Matusz (1–5) ||  ||12,325  || 47–73
|-  style="text-align:center; background:#fbb;"
| 121 || August 17 || @ Athletics || 5–6 || McCarthy (6–6) || Simón (3–6)
|| Bailey (15) || 20,448 || 47–74
|-  style="text-align:center; background:#fbb;"
| 122 || August 19 || @ Angels || 3–8 || Haren (13–6) || Reyes (6–10) ||  || 38,156 || 47–75
|-  style="text-align:center; background:#fbb;"
| 123 || August 20 || @ Angels || 8–9 (12) || Rodney (3–5) || Gregg (0–2) ||  || 43,201 || 47–76
|-  style="text-align:center; background:#fbb;"
| 124 || August 21 || @ Angels || 1–7 || Williams (1–0) || Matusz (1–6) ||  || 37,148 || 47–77
|-  style="text-align:center; background:#bfb;"
| 125 || August 22 || @ Twins || 4–1 || Britton (7–9) || Pavano (6–10) || Gregg (18) || 38,986 || 48–77
|-  style="text-align:center; background:#bfb;"
| 126 || August 23 || @ Twins || 8–1 || Simón (4–6) || Duensing (8–13) || || 38,786 || 49–77
|-  style="text-align:center; background:#bfb;"
| 127 || August 24 || @ Twins || 6–1 || Guthrie (6–16) || Slowey (0–2) || || 37,778 || 50–77
|-  style="text-align:center; background:#bfb;"
| 128 || August 25 || @ Twins || 6–1 || Reyes (7–10) || Swarzak (3–4) || || 38,406 || 51–77
|-  style="text-align:center; background:#bfb;"
| 129 || August 26 || Yankees || 12–5 || Hunter (3–2) || Burnett (9–11) || || 32,762 || 52–77
|-  style="text-align:center; background:#bbb;"
| || August 27 || Yankees || colspan=6| Postponed (Hurricane Irene); Makeup: September 8 
|-  style="text-align:center; background:#bfb;"
| 130 || August 28 || Yankees || 2–0 || Britton (7–9) || Colón (8–9) || Gregg (19) || 28,751 || 53–77
|-  style="text-align:center; background:#fbb;"
| 131 || August 28 || Yankees || 3–8 || Nova (14–4) || Matusz (1–7) || || 37,528 || 53–78
|-  style="text-align:center; background:#fbb;"
| 132 || August 29 || Yankees || 2–3 || García (11–7) || Simón (4–7) || Rivera (34) || 18,223 || 53–79
|-  style="text-align:center; background:#bfb;"
| 133 || August 30 || Blue Jays || 6–5 (10) || Eyre (1–0) || Tallet (0–2) ||  || 10,756 || 54–79 
|-  style="text-align:center; background:#fbb;"
| 134 || August 31 || Blue Jays || 0–13 || Álvarez (1–2) || Reyes (7–11) || || 14,211 || 54–80 
|-

|-  style="text-align:center; background:#fbb;"
| 135 || September 1 || Blue Jays || 6–8 || Camp (2–3) || Eyre (1–1) || Francisco (12) || 11,617 || 54–81
|-  style="text-align:center; background:#bfb;"
| 136 || September 2 || @ Rays || 3–2 || Britton (9–9) || Price (12–12) || Gregg (20) || 11,955 || 55–81
|-  style="text-align:center; background:#fbb;"
| 137 || September 3 || @ Rays || 3–6 || Davis (9–8) || Simón (4–8) || Farnsworth (23) || 14,233 || 55–82
|-  style="text-align:center; background:#fbb;"
| 138 || September 4 || @ Rays || 1–8 || Hellickson (12–10) || Guthrie (6–17) ||  || 15,790 || 55–83
|-  style="text-align:center; background:#fbb;"
| 139 || September 5 || @ Yankees || 10–11 ||Laffey (2–1)||Johnson (5–5)||Rivera (38)||45,069||55–84 
|-  style="text-align:center; background:#fbb;"
| 140 || September 6 || @ Yankees || 3–5 ||Wade (4–0)||Hunter (3–3)||Rivera (39)||44,573||55–85 
|-  style="text-align:center; background:#bfb;"
| 141 || September 7 || @ Yankees || 5–4  (11) || Strop (1–1)|| Noesí (2–1)|| Johnson (3)|| 40,104 || 56–85
|-  style="text-align:center; background:#bfb;"
| 142 || September 8 || Yankees || 5–4  (10) || Rapada (1–0) || Proctor (2–4) ||  || 33,841 || 57–85 
|-  style="text-align:center; background:#bfb;"
| 143 || September 9 || @ Blue Jays || 2–0 || Guthrie (7–17) || Cecil (4–9) || Johnson (4) || 13,918 || 58–85
|-  style="text-align:center; background:#fbb;"
| 144 || September 10 || @ Blue Jays || 4–5 || Litsch (6–3) || Gregg (0–3) ||  || 17,742 || 58–86
|-  style="text-align:center; background:#fbb;"
| 145 || September 11 || @ Blue Jays || 5–6 || Carreño (1–0) || Hunter (3–4) || Francisco (14) || 14,235 || 58–87
|-  style="text-align:center; background:#fbb;"
| 146 || September 12 || Rays || 2–5 || Niemann (10–7) || Britton (9–10) || Peralta (3) || 11,924 || 58–88
|- style="text-align:center; background:#bfb;"
| 147 || September 13 || Rays || 4–2 || Patton (1–1) || Howell (2–3) || Johnson (5) || 13,262 || 59–88
|- style="text-align:center; background:#bfb;"
| 148 || September 14 || Rays || 6–2 || Guthrie (8–17) || Davis (10–9) || Johnson (6) || 14,669 || 60–88
|- style="text-align:center; background:#bfb;"
| 149 || September 16 || Angels || 8–3 || Hunter (4–4) || Haren (15–9) ||  || 24,022 || 61–88
|- style="text-align:center; background:#bfb;"
| 150 || September 17 || Angels || 6–2 || Britton (10–10) || Santana (11–12) ||  || 31,099 || 62–88
|- style="text-align:center; background:#fbb;"
| 151 || September 18 || Angels || 2–11 || Weaver (18–7) || Simón (4–9) ||  || 27471 || 62–89
|- style="text-align:center; background:#bfb;"
| 152 || September 19 || @ Red Sox || 6–5 || Guthrie (9–17) || Weiland (0–3) || Johnson (7) || 37,885 || 63–89
|- style="text-align:center; background:#fbb;"
| 153 || September 19 || @ Red Sox || 9–18 || Atchison (1–0) || Matusz (1–8) || || 37,261 || 63–90
|- style="text-align:center; background:#bfb;"
| 154 || September 20 || @ Red Sox || 7–5 || Eyre (2–1) || Bard (2–9) || Johnson (8) || 37,414 || 64–90
|- style="text-align:center; background:#bfb;"
| 155 || September 21 || @ Red Sox || 6–4 || Rapada (2–0) || Beckett (13–6) || Johnson (9) || 38,004 || 65–90
|- style="text-align:center; background:#bfb;"
| 156 || September 22 || @ Tigers || 6–5 || Britton (11–10) || Pauley (5–6) || Gregg (21) || 27,847 || 66–90 
|- style="text-align:center; background:#fbb;"
| 157 || September 23 || @ Tigers || 3–4 (11) || Perry (1–0) || Eyre (2–2) || || 38,623 || 66–91 
|- style="text-align:center; background:#bfb;"
| 158 || September 24 || @ Tigers || 6–5 || Strop (2–1) || Schlereth (2–2) || Gregg (22) || 44,846|| 67–91 
|- style="text-align:center; background:#fbb;"
| 159 || September 25 || @ Tigers || 6–10 || Penny (11–11) || Matusz (1–9) || || 41,051 || 67–92 
|- style="text-align:center; background:#bfb;"
| 160 || September 26|| Red Sox || 6–3  || Patton (2–1)  || Beckett (13–7) ||  || 21,786 || 68–92
|- style="text-align:center; background:#fbb;"
| 161 || September 27 || Red Sox || 7–8 || Aceves (10–2) || Britton (11–11) || Papelbon (31) || 22,123 || 68–93
|- style="text-align:center; background:#bfb;"
| 162 || September 28 || Red Sox || 4–3 || Johnson (6–5) || Papelbon (4–1) || || 29,749 || 69–93 
|-

Player stats

Batting
Note: G = Games played; AB = At bats; R = Runs scored; H = Hits; 2B = Doubles; 3B = Triples; HR = Home runs; RBI = Runs batted in; AVG = Batting average; SB = Stolen bases

Pitching
Note: W = Wins; L = Losses; ERA = Earned run average; G = Games pitched; GS = Games started; SV = Saves; IP = Innings pitched; R = Runs allowed; ER = Earned runs allowed; BB = Walks allowed; K = Strikeouts

Farm system

References

External links
2011 Baltimore Orioles season at Official site
2011 Baltimore Orioles season at Baseball Reference

Baltimore Orioles seasons
Baltimore Orioles
Baltimore